Events from the year 2019 in Kosovo.

Incumbents 
 President: Hashim Thaçi
 Prime Minister: Ramush Haradinaj

Events 
 10–14 April – The 2019 IHF Inter-Continental Trophy was held in Pristina.

Deaths 

 13 February – Idriz Ajeti, Albanologist (b. 1917).

See also 

 2019 in Europe

References 

 
Kosovo
Kosovo
2010s in Kosovo
Years of the 21st century in Kosovo